Stefan Wagner (17 October 1913 – 6 November 2002) was an Austrian international footballer.

References

1913 births
2002 deaths
Association football defenders
Austrian footballers
Austria international footballers
SK Rapid Wien players
Place of birth missing